Federal elections were held in Switzerland on 27 October 1935. The Social Democratic Party emerged as the largest party in the National Council, winning 50 of the 187 seats.

Results

National Council

By constituency

Council of the States
In several cantons the members of the Council of the States were chosen by the cantonal parliaments.

By canton

References

Switzerland
Federal elections in Switzerland
Federal
Switzerland